PQA or pqa may refer to:

 Port Qasim Authority
 The Pauline Quirke Academy
 pqa, the ISO 639-3 code for Paʼa language, Bauchi State, Nigeria